Sandhya Rani Tudu is an Indian politician. She was elected to the West Bengal Legislative Assembly from Manbazar as a member of the Trinamool Congress.

References

External links
 

State cabinet ministers of West Bengal
Living people
Year of birth missing (living people)